Fill may refer to: 

 Fill dirt, soil added to an area
 Fill (archaeology), the material that has accumulated or has been deposited into a cut feature such as ditch or pit
 Fill, dirt, rock or other material added to level or raise the elevation of a land feature, see Cut and fill 
 Fill character, a character transmitted solely for the purpose of consuming time
 Fill device, an electronic module that loads cryptographic keys into an electronic encryption machine
 Fill (music), a short segment of instrumental music
 In textiles, the filling yarn is the same as weft, the yarn which is shuttled back and forth across the warp to create a woven fabric.
 In finance, a fill is the fulfillment of a part or whole of an order at a given price by a broker or counterparty
 Fill flash, a technique in photography where the flash is used in bright locations to prevent shadows from being underexposed
 Fill light, background lighting used to reduce the contrast of a scene and provide some illumination for the areas of the image that would otherwise be in shadow
 Flood fill or Fill pattern, the color, pattern, or texture that fills an area in graphic design
 Matter that is contained in a pillow, cushion, quilt, etc., or used to protect items in a package; it may have more specific names, e.g., fiberfill, foamfill, etc., some being tradenames or brands
 Fill power, a measure of the loft or "fluffiness" of a down product that is loosely related to the insulating value of the down

People with the surname 
 Martino Fill (born 1939), Italian alpine skier
 Peter Fill (born 1982), Italian alpine ski racer
 Shannon Fill (born 1971), American TV actress

See also 

 Embankment (transportation)
 Filler (disambiguation)
 Filling (disambiguation)
 Fill-in (disambiguation)